Ancient Electrons is the first full length album by musical artist Analog Rebellion (formerly PlayRadioPlay!).  It was released on January 26, 2010 alongside the album Besides, Nothing (B-Sides and Rarities, 2003-2009), the artist's last release under the name "PlayRadioPlay!".

Daniel Hunter announced the track listing for Ancient Electrons in October 2009 via AbsolutePunk, Twitter and MySpace. It features 12 songs and 3 segues.

The album cover was released on his Facebook page on December 22, 2009.

Track listing
 "Brain ≠ Heart (I Need to Know)" - 6:16
 "A Particularly Long Elevator Shaft" - 3:45
 "A Real Clever Trick Fur a Bear" - 3:41
 "You've Been Had (Machine)" - 4:03
 "An Exercise in Humility" (Segue) - 1:21
 "Sombrero Negro" - 2:21
 "North Korea and Kim Jong Il's Fat Fucking Face" (Segue) - 0:39
 "In the Style of a Tight Rope Walker" - 4:22
 "Marla Singer Doesn't Take Standardized Tests (Disposable Smile)" - 5:00
 "Concerning Phillip Garrido" - 4:03
 "I Am a Ghost (Artifact)" - 3:02
 "All These Parasites, Uh Huh" (Segue) - 1:09
 "The New School Shooter" - 6:05
 "The Parasite Life" - 4:24
 "An Onest Thank You (Credits & Genres)" - 1:49

References

2009 albums
Analog Rebellion albums